The 1982 Utah State Aggies football team represented Utah State University during the 1982 NCAA Division I-A football season as a member of the Pacific Coast Athletic Association (PCAA). The Aggies were led by seventh-year head coach Bruce Snyder and played their home games at Romney Stadium in Logan, Utah. They finished the season with a record of five wins and six losses (5–6, 2–4 PCAA). This was the final season that Snyder served as head coach of the Aggies as he resigned his position on February 28, 1983, and became an assistant coach with the Los Angeles Rams.

Schedule

References

Utah State
Utah State Aggies football seasons
Utah State Aggies football